Santiba was a line of soft drinks sold by The Coca-Cola Company in the United States. The flavors sold include ginger ale, club soda, quinine water and a citrus soda. It was introduced in 1969.
No Longer Produced.  The trademark for Santiba was issued to Coca-Cola in 1969 and shows a trademark status of 900 which means expired or abandoned as of 1992.

References

External links
Trademark information at Justia.com

S